The 1990 Spanish Grand Prix was a Formula One motor race held at Jerez on 30 September 1990.

The 73-lap race was won by Alain Prost, driving a Ferrari, with teammate Nigel Mansell second and Alessandro Nannini third in a Benetton-Ford. Prost's Drivers' Championship rival, Ayrton Senna, took the 50th pole position of his career in his McLaren-Honda, but retired with a failed radiator, allowing Prost to close to within nine points of him in the championship with two races remaining.

The event was marred by a serious incident during Friday practice, when Martin Donnelly crashed his Lotus at the high-speed Turn 14. Donnelly was thrown from the wreckage, suffering serious injuries that ended his Formula One career. This also turned out to be the last F1 race for Nannini, who severed his right arm in a helicopter crash the following week (though he would return to racing as a touring car driver), as well as the last race for the back-marking EuroBrun and Life teams.

Qualifying

Pre-qualifying report
In the Friday morning pre-qualifying session, the same four drivers went through to the main qualifying sessions as had progressed in the previous three events. This time it was Yannick Dalmas who topped the time sheets in his AGS, the first time he had done so this season. Gabriele Tarquini made it an AGS 1–2, just over a tenth of a second behind. Olivier Grouillard was a shade slower in third in the Osella, while Bertrand Gachot was nearly two seconds slower in the Coloni, back in fourth.

In fifth place, Roberto Moreno missed the cut by just 0.018 of a second in the EuroBrun, with Claudio Langes just over a second behind in sixth. Langes' gap to Gachot of 1.133 seconds represented the closest the Italian had come all season to successfully pre-qualifying, as he had failed to pre-qualify for all 14 races so far this season. This proved to be his last opportunity, as EuroBrun withdrew from Formula One after this event. It was also the last event for the hapless Life team, who also withdrew from the sport after this weekend. Bruno Giacomelli managed two laps in the L190 before it stopped out on the circuit, the switch to the Judd engine apparently not providing much improvement. The car had never come within 12 seconds of pre-qualifying successfully at any of its 14 events. The absence of EuroBrun and Life at the last two Grands Prix of the season avoided the need for pre-qualifying at those events.

Pre-qualifying classification

Qualifying report

Qualifying classification

Race

Race report
On the start Patrese collided with Jean Alesi, and sending the Frenchman into a heavy spin at turn 1 into the gravel trap and then retired as a result. As it was Senna who lead the early stages before lap 27 as Nelson Piquet then took the lead for two laps as a result of not pitting before Prost then took the lead on lap 29, Piquet who pitted after 40 laps would eventually retire with battery problems after 48 laps, Ayrton Senna would also retire with the result of a punctured radiator on lap 54 forcing the Brazilian into retirement, as did Gerhard Berger after colliding with Thierry Boutsen on Lap 57. From there the Ferrari drivers eventually dominated the race with reigning world champion Alain Prost leading his teammate Nigel Mansell home by 22 seconds for a 1-2 finish. British Team Lotus driver Martin Donnelly had a horrific crash during Friday practice at the very fast Turn 14; the seat of his Lotus 102 broke free and was flung clear of the wreck. Donnelly received serious injuries that took months of recovery, bringing an end to his Formula One career, although he later returned to racing. Team Lotus decided not to retire from the race, and Derek Warwick was close to the point-scoring positions when he became the race's final retirement on lap 63 with a broken gearbox in the other Lotus 102. Donnelly attributed his survival to safety improvements made after Riccardo Paletti's fatal accident at the 1982 Canadian Grand Prix.

The race also turned out to be the last race of Alessandro Nannini's Formula One career. Nannini claimed the final podium position of the race in his Benetton B190, the ninth podium of his career, finishing ahead of the Williams pair of Thierry Boutsen and Riccardo Patrese. One week after the race, his right arm was severed in a helicopter accident. Nannini recovered and returned to racing as a touring car driver.

At the start of the race, Gerhard Berger, desperate to move up from his fifth place on the grid, gave Jean Alesi no room, resulting in Alesi moving to the outside, where he was hit and put out of the race by Riccardo Patrese.

The Larrousse-Lola of Aguri Suzuki claimed the final championship point of the race, continuing an encouraging season for the French team. It was an encouraging race for another French team, Yannick Dalmas and Gabriele Tarquini both qualified in AGS JH25s in a first for the team, but AGS never again got two cars onto a Formula One grid. Dalmas finished in ninth position, the highlight of the season for the small French team. The ninth-placed finish saved the team from pre-qualifying for the first half of 1991 as it moved them up to a crucial 13th place in the Constructors Championship. As a consequence, Scuderia Italia dropped into pre-qualifying, as they failed to finish higher than 10th all season.

McLaren driver Ayrton Senna's lap 53 retirement with a failed radiator reduced his lead in the world championship over Prost to nine points with just the Japanese and Australian Grands Prix remaining in the season.

Race classification

Championship standings after the race

Drivers' Championship standings

Constructors' Championship standings

References

Spanish Grand Prix
Spanish Grand Prix
Grand Prix